Crinodendron patagua, the patagua or lily of the valley tree (also a name for Clethra arborea), is an evergreen tree that grows in Chile from 33° to 36° South latitude, up to 1200 m (4000 ft) above sea level in elevation. It lives in wet places and prefers ravines. An endangered associate tree is the Chilean wine palm, Jubaea chilensis, whose distribution was much wider prehistorically. This tree reaches a height up to 10 m (33 ft).

Leaves are simple, oblong with serrate margin. It produces white flowers with bell-shaped corolla of five petals, the fruit is a capsule which is orange-colored when mature.

According to Chilean folklore the patagua originates from women who cried before God in repentance of their sins. Because of this they were saved from obliteration but suffered, in contrast to "just" people, transformation into trees. This would explain the pataguas common resemblance to human figures and why some Indigenous people would fall in love with some pataguas. Folklore also says pataguas may signal the presence of an entierro.

Cultivation and uses
It is used for honey  production. The tannin contained in bark is used for tanning leather. The wood is used in furniture. It is used for reforestation. It is easy to cultivate, it can be planted by seeds and very fast-growing and tolerates frosts. It has been introduced successfully as ornamental in New Zealand, California, Northern Ireland, Scotland, Wales and some parts of England, although it does not flower as freely in the United Kingdom as the equally ornamental and more widely cultivated  Crinodendron hookerianum, which is red or pink-flowered.
 
Etymology: Crinodendron (Greek: "lily tree") and patagua (mapuche name of the tree). Formerly named Tricuspidaria dependens Ruiz et Pav.

References 
Adriana Hoffman. 1998. Flora Silvestre de Chile. Fundación Claudio Gay. Santiago.
C. Donoso. 2005. Árboles nativos de Chile. Guía de reconocimiento. Valdivia, Chile
 C. Michael Hogan (2008) Chilean Wine Palm: Jubaea chilensis, GlobalTwitcher.com, ed. N. Stromberg
Juan Ignacio Molina. 1782. Crinodendron patagua in Encyclopedia of Chilean Flora, Sag. Stor. Nat. Chili. 179, 353

Line notes

External links

Trees of Chile
Elaeocarpaceae
Ornamental trees